Ian Matheson Eliason (6 June 1945 – 24 February 2019) was a New Zealand rugby union player. A lock, Eliason represented Taranaki at a provincial level, and was a member of the New Zealand national side, the All Blacks, from 1972 to 1973. He played 19 games for the All Blacks but did not appear in any test matches.

Eliason died in New Plymouth on 24 February 2019.

References

1945 births
2019 deaths
People from Kaponga
People educated at Opunake High School
New Zealand rugby union players
New Zealand international rugby union players
Taranaki rugby union players
Rugby union locks
Rugby union players from Taranaki